Martin Fredrik Seip (20 May 1921 – 6 May 2001) was a Norwegian physician.

He was the brother of politician Helge Seip. He took the dr.med. degree in 1953. He was appointed chief pediatrician at Rikshospitalet in 1968, and became a professor of medicine the same year. He chaired the Norwegian Medical Association from 1966 to 1969.

He resided at Blommenholm.

References

1921 births
2001 deaths
Norwegian pediatricians
University of Oslo alumni
Academic staff of the University of Oslo
Martin Fredrik